Tauranga South is a suburb of Tauranga, on New Zealand's North Island. It is located south-east of Judea, north-east of Gate Pa and south-west of Tauranga Central.

Property prices in the suburb have risen sharply, largely due to demand for land in the area.

The suburb has a bowls club which hosts bowls players from across the country.

Demographics

Tauranga South had a population of 6,888 at the 2018 New Zealand census, an increase of 630 people (10.1%) since the 2013 census, and an increase of 633 people (10.1%) since the 2006 census. There were 2,745 households, comprising 3,327 males and 3,558 females, giving a sex ratio of 0.94 males per female, with 1,167 people (16.9%) aged under 15 years, 1,230 (17.9%) aged 15 to 29, 3,039 (44.1%) aged 30 to 64, and 1,452 (21.1%) aged 65 or older.

Ethnicities were 72.3% European/Pākehā, 19.4% Māori, 4.1% Pacific peoples, 14.2% Asian, and 1.7% other ethnicities. People may identify with more than one ethnicity.

The percentage of people born overseas was 24.7, compared with 27.1% nationally.

Although some people chose not to answer the census's question about religious affiliation, 44.1% had no religion, 39.2% were Christian, 2.4% had Māori religious beliefs, 2.0% were Hindu, 1.1% were Muslim, 0.5% were Buddhist and 4.3% had other religions.

Of those at least 15 years old, 1,161 (20.3%) people had a bachelor's or higher degree, and 1,116 (19.5%) people had no formal qualifications. 759 people (13.3%) earned over $70,000 compared to 17.2% nationally. The employment status of those at least 15 was that 2,541 (44.4%) people were employed full-time, 783 (13.7%) were part-time, and 234 (4.1%) were unemployed.

Economy

Fraser Cove shopping centre opened in Tauranga South in 2002. It covers 32,500 m² with 1235 carparks. The mall has 35 shops, including The Warehouse and a Countdown supermarket.

Education

Tauranga Special School, Tauranga's only school for students with special learning needs, is also located in Tauranga South.

References

Suburbs of Tauranga
Populated places around the Tauranga Harbour